Osamu Kobayashi is the name of:

Osamu Kobayashi (animation director) (born 1945), animation director and founder of Ajia-do Animation Works
Osamu Kobayashi (illustrator) (1964–2021), director of BECK: Mongolian Chop Squad and Paradise Kiss
Osamu Kobayashi (voice actor) (1934–2011), Japanese voice actor